Two ships of the British Royal Navy have borne the name HMS Scipion, after the French term for the Roman general Scipio Africanus:

  a 74-gun third rate, previously the French  . She was handed over to the British in 1793, and was burnt by accident later that year.
 HMS Scipion was the French 74-gun third rate Scipion, which the British captured in 1805; she was broken up in 1819.

See also
 Ships named 

Royal Navy ship names